Ethmia festiva is a moth in the family Depressariidae. It is found from south-eastern Mexico, Costa Rica and Guatemala to northern Colombia.

The ground color of the forewings is white with distinct brownish black lines which reflect bluish. The ground color of the hindwings is whitish, becoming brownish apically. Adults are on wing from late March to May (in Yucatán and Panama), in July (Oaxaca and Nicaragua) and in July and October (in Colombia).

References

Moths described in 1912
festiva